WRXQ (100.7 FM) is a radio station broadcasting an active rock format. Licensed to Coal City, Illinois, United States, it serves the Joliet area. The station is currently owned by Alpha Media  and features programming from ABC Radio. WRXQ's studios are located in Crest Hill, and its transmitter is in Wilmington Township, Illinois.

History

WKBM
The station began broadcasting on February 8, 1990, holding the call sign WKBM, and airing an oldies format. WKBM carried programming from the Satellite Music Network, and also featured local personalities. It was originally owned by Barden Broadcasting, and had an ERP of 1.4 kw at an HAAT of 482 feet. In 1998, the station was sold to Pride Communications.

WBVS
In April 1998, the station's call sign was changed to WBVS, and its format was changed from oldies to CHR.  WBVS was branded as "100.7 The Bus", with the slogan "Today's Hottest Hits". "The Bus" branding had previously been used in the area by 99.9 WBUS in Kankakee, Illinois from 1985 to 1996, while that station aired a CHR format.  In 2000, its ERP was increased to 2,450 watts. That year, the station was sold to NextMedia Group.

WRXQ
In January 2003, the station's call sign was changed to WRXQ, and it began airing a classic rock format as "100.7 RXQ", with the slogan "The Southland's Classic Rock". In 2012 the station's branding was changed to Q Rock, and it began to transition to a mainstream rock format. It has since transitioned to an active rock format.

In 2013, NextMedia's stations were sold to Digity LCC, and in 2016, Digity LCC's stations were sold to Alpha Media. Effective April 8, 2019, Walnut Radio Illinois purchased WRXQ from Alpha Media for $300,000.

References

External links

RXQ
Active rock radio stations in the United States
Radio stations established in 1990
1990 establishments in Illinois